Thomas Thornhagh (fl. 1393) was an English politician.

He was elected Mayor of Lincoln for 1390–91 and was Coroner of Lincoln for at least three years (by 1392 until after 21 September 1395).

He was a Member (MP) of the Parliament of England for Lincoln in 1393.

References

14th-century births
Year of death missing
English MPs 1393
Members of the Parliament of England (pre-1707) for Lincoln
Mayors of Lincoln, England